Now Deh-e Katul (also Romanized as Now Deh-e Katūl) is a village in Katul Rural District, in the Central District of Aliabad County, Golestan Province, Iran. At the 2006 census, its population was 996, in 257 families.

References 

Populated places in Aliabad County